Admiral Peregrine Osborne, 2nd Duke of Leeds (1659 – 25 June 1729), styled Viscount Osborne between 1673 and 1689, Earl of Danby between 1689 and 1694 and Marquess of Carmarthen between 1694 and 1712, was an English Tory politician.

Background
Osborne was the second son of the Thomas Osborne (later 1st Duke of Leeds) and his wife, Bridget, a daughter of the Montagu Bertie, 2nd Earl of Lindsey. In 1673, his father was created Viscount Osborne in the Peerage of Scotland, but surrendered the title in favour of Peregrine when the former was created Viscount Latimer in the Peerage of England later that year.

Political career
In 1677, Osborne sat in Parliament as member of parliament for Berwick-upon-Tweed and then briefly for Corfe Castle when he succeeded his brother to the seat in 1679. In 1689, he briefly sat in Parliament again, this time for York. He held the seat for almost a year when he left the Commons in 1689 after being called up to House of Lords in his father's barony of Osborne.

From then on, however, he did not take an active role in the Lords, instead choosing a career in the Royal Navy. He was 'made post' as a captain on 2 January 1691, and was promoted to rear-admiral on 7 July 1693. He was involved in the Attack on Brest on 18 June 1694. He took a practical interest in the design of warships, and as a ship designer he served as liaison with the Russian Tsar Peter the Great on his visit to London in 1698. He also helped negotiate a proposal of tobacco merchants to ship their products to Russia. In 1699 he designed the Sixth Rate ship Peregrine Galley, which was launched at Sheerness Dockyard in 1700. He became a Vice Admiral of the Red on 8 May 1702 and became a full admiral on 21 December 1708.

Family
On 25 April 1682, he married Bridget Hyde (the only daughter and heiress of Sir Thomas Hyde, 2nd Baronet) and they had four children:

 William Henry Osborne, Viscount Latimer and later Earl of Danby (1690–1711)
Lord Peregrine Hyde, briefly Earl of Danby, then Marquess of Carmarthen and later 3rd Duke of Leeds (1691–1731)
 Lady Mary Osborne (1688–1722), who married Henry Somerset, 2nd Duke of Beaufort. After his death, she married John Cochrane, 4th Earl of Dundonald
 Lady Bridget Osborne, who married Rev. William Williams, Prebendary of Chichester Cathedral.

Danby inherited his father's titles in 1712 and upon his own death in 1729, was succeeded in them by his second son, Peregrine. He was buried in the Osborne family chapel at All Hallows Church, Harthill, South Yorkshire.

See also
List of deserters from James II to William of Orange

References

Further reading
Murdoch, Tessa (ed.). Noble Households: Eighteenth-Century Inventories of Great English Houses (Cambridge, John Adamson, 2006)  . For inventories of Kiveton and of Thorp Salvin, both houses in Yorkshire belonging to the duke, see pp. 246–65 and pp. 266–9.

|-

English admirals
Royal Navy vice admirals
Lord-Lieutenants of the East Riding of Yorkshire
1659 births
1729 deaths
Peregrine
102
17th-century Scottish peers
English MPs 1661–1679
English MPs 1679
English MPs 1689–1690
East York Militia officers
17th-century Royal Navy personnel
British military personnel of the Nine Years' War
Burials at Osborne family chapel, All Hallows' Church (Harthill)